The St. Stephen's Cathedral or simply Cathedral of Litoměřice, is the name given to a religious building of the Catholic Church that works as a cathedral of the Diocese of Litoměřice, and is also one of the most important cultural sites in the city. It is protected as a cultural monument of the Czech Republic.

Located on a hill in the place of an older church (originally a basilica) The temple was built in Romanesque style in the 11th century and rebuilt in the 14th century in the Gothic style. In the presbytery is a large altar dedicated to St. Stephen, patron of the cathedral.

There have been various modifications and repairs especially in 1716, 1778, 1825 and 1892.

See also
Roman Catholicism in the Czech Republic
St. Stephen's Cathedral

References

Roman Catholic cathedrals in the Czech Republic
Buildings and structures in Litoměřice